Fadi Azzam (Arabic: فادي عزام; born 1973, As-Suwayda, Syria) is a Syrian novelist and poet.

Early life and education

He was born in As-Suwayda in southern Syria in 1973 and went to university in Damascus, graduating in 1998. He has published in Arabic newspapers and magazines, and he reported on arts and culture for Al Quds al-Arabi from 2007 to 2009. He has also worked with visual media, such as documentaries and cartoons.

Career
In 2012, his debut novel Sarmada, about a Druze community in Syria, was longlisted for the Arabic Booker Prize. He was longlisted again in 2018 for his novel Bait Huddud (Huddud's house).
His poem "If You Are Syrian These Days …" was translated into English by Ghada Alatrash and published by literary magazine ArabLit in 2023.

Works 

 سرمدة : رواية (Sarmada, a novel).  Thaqāfah lil-Nashr wa-al-Tawzīʻ, 2011. 
 Translated into English as Sarmada by Adam Talib (Arabia Books, 2011). 
 رحلة الى قبور ثلاثة شعراء : آرثر رامبو، فرانز كافكا، فيرناندو بيسوا، برفقة رياض الصالح الحسين (A trip to the graves of three poets, Arthur Rimbaud, Franz Kafka, Fernando Pessoa, accompanied by Riad Al-Saleh Al-Hussein). Jadāwil lil-Nashr wa-al-Tarjamah wa-al-Tawzīʻ, 2016. 
 بيت حدد : رواية (Hudud's house, a novel). Dār al-Ādāb, 2017. 
 الوصايا (The wills). Hachette Antoine, 2018.

References

Syrian novelists
1973 births
Living people